BlueMotion is a trade name for certain car models from the Volkswagen Group with an emphasis on higher fuel efficiency.

Volkswagen introduced the name in 2006 on the Polo Mk4 BlueMotion, and in 2007 a version based on the current Passat was released. BlueMotion versions of the Golf Mk5 and Touran, as well as the then 13-year-old Sharan, were released in 2008. It was also made in 2009 for other models including Jetta, Caddy and Touareg, and others afterwards. The name refers to Volkswagen Group's corporate color, blue, with the word 'motion' added to denote mobility, and echoes DaimlerChrysler's BlueTec engines with NOx reducing technology for diesel-powered vehicle emissions control.

This technology has also been used in SEAT's models like the SEAT Ibiza or the SEAT León under the name 'EcoMotive', and in the Škoda Fabia and Superb, where the technology is called "GreenLine".

The Ibiza was subsequently changed to the 1.2 L TDI engine.

Fuel economy
The cars have a fuel efficient engine, aerodynamic body, low ride height, auto stop-start, programmed battery charging system, longer gearing and low rolling resistance tires. On 30 June 2011 a Volkswagen Passat 1.6 TDI BlueMotion set a world record for the greatest distance driven on a single tank of fuel, recognized by the Guinness Book of Records, achieving .

BlueMotion strategy
BlueMotion technologies include products and technologies to improve fuel economy and reduce emissions. Currently, they cover the TDI (turbocharged diesel direct injection) and TSI (boosted petrol stratified direct injection) engines and the Direct Shift Gearbox (DSG). They are supplemented by technologies like drive variants including EcoFuel (natural gas
engines), BiFuel (liquid natural gas engines), MultiFuel (ethanol engines), hybrid systems and electric drives, as well as NOx emissions control, regenerative braking and the Stop-Start system. Products / vehicles, including these, are currently grouped under three Volkswagen brands: 'BlueMotion', 'BlueMotion Technology' and 'BlueTDI'.

The BlueMotion brands represent the most fuel efficient model of its line and has the following:

Engine Revised engine mapping, diesel particulate filters and oxidizing catalytic converters help lower fuel consumption and NOx levels. In the more modern models, there's also a start-stop system that halts and restarts the motor at brief stops.
Transmission The last two gear ratios are longer than on standard TDI engine gearboxes.
Reduced rolling resistance Low-resistance tires and better aerodynamics through lowered suspension, redesigned spoilers and additional enhancements underneath the car giving less drag which produces better fuel economy.

BlueMotion Technology
BlueMotion Technology packages can be configured with TSI and TDI engines.
The package includes start-stop system, change gear indicator and regenerative braking technology. The 2015 Golf GTI (mark VII) is available in BlueMotion version.

In Brazil
Currently BlueMotion in Brazil focuses on reduced rolling resistance and taller gearbox ratios, among other changes.

The Polo Bluemotion, the first model with the BlueMotion label in Brazil, uses the 1.6 TotalFlex (gasoline/alcohol) engine which is found in the other models. In April 2012 VW introduced in Brazil the Fox Bluemotion with the same engine.

Volkswagen Commercial Vehicles
Volkswagen Commercial Vehicles offer a Multivan, Transporter and Crafter BlueMotion and BlueMotion Technology packages.

See also
Volkswagen emissions scandal
Efficient Dynamics – BMW's equivalent branding
BlueTec – Daimler's equivalent branding
ECOnetic – Ford of Europe's similar branded low emissions range

References

External links 
 Volkswagen website on bluemotion technology

Volkswagen Group
Volkswagen Group engines
Green vehicles
Automotive technology tradenames